Things That Lovers Do is a collaborative studio album by American singers and real-life couple Kenny Lattimore and Chanté Moore. It was released by Arista Records on February 11, 2003. The album includes covers of classic 1970's and 1980's soul duets by singers Karyn White and Babyface, Marvin Gaye and Tammi Terrell, and more. It peaked at number thirty-one on the US Billboard 200 and number three on the US Top R&B/Hip-Hop Albums chart, with first week sales of 47,000 units. Things That Lovers Do was preceded by two singles: "Loveable (From Your Head to Your Toes)" and "You Don't Have to Cry".

Background and release 
According to executive producer Antonio Reid, the album release was timed to coincide with Valentine's Day. Lattimore Moore took an unorthodox route to promoting their album by mounting a full stage show also titled Things That Lovers Do. The play toured through Richmond, New York, Chicago, Philadelphia, Atlanta, Washington, DC, and Detroit from January 2003 through March 2003. Also starring in the play were comedian/actress Kym Whitley and actor Clifton Powell who plays a less-than-deserving fiancé to Chante's character. The play was directed and staged by Tony Award-winner George Faison.

The album artwork bears a "warning" on the back stating that the CD "may cause pregnancy," making reference to the fact that Chante became pregnant with the couple's first child during the recording of the album. In the music video for the single "You Don't Have To Cry," both Lattimore and Moore appear to sing in separate shots. The end of the clip reveals that both are against an adjacent wall as the camera pans down to discover Moore's prominently showing stomach. Shortly after the release of the album and close of the stage play, she gave birth to a son named Kenneth Lattimore Jr. at 9 pounds and 20 inches long in Los Angeles, CA. Kenneth Jr. was born on April 10, 2003, the same date as his father's birthday.

Critical reception

Allmusic gave the album a positive review, stating that "when an album bears the legend "WARNING! This project may cause pregnancy!," it better contain some serious lovemaking grooves. Things That Lovers Do luckily lives up to its claims, delivering an old-school-inspired slice of sweet slow-jam music that sounds like it could inspire more action than Barry White's waterbed [...] A modern R&B classic in the making, Things That Lovers Do combines the best of old and new R&B to create what may very well be the ultimate make-out album."

People wrote that Lattimore and Moore "make a perfect musical marriage on this candlelight collection of duets, including 10 classic-soul covers plus two new songs [...] Best is their radiant rendition of Billy Preston and Syreeta’s 1980 hit “With You I’m Born Again,” on which Lattimore and Moore seem born to sing together." Craig Seymour from Entertainment Weekly found that "the results are exqui-sitely competent and utterly boring. Both singers have fine voices, especially the Minnie Riperton-like Moore. But their pairings consistently lack heat and seem to be more about politeness than passion."

Singles
"Loveable (From Your Head to Your Toes)" was released as the lead single from the album in 2002. "You Don't Have to Cry" was released as the second single from the album in 2003. A music video for the song was released.

Track listing

Charts

Weekly charts

Year-end charts

Release history

References

External links
 

2003 albums
Kenny Lattimore albums
Chanté Moore albums
Covers albums